Griffin and Phoenix may refer to:
Griffin and Phoenix (1976 film), a television romance film starring Peter Falk and Jill Clayburgh
Griffin & Phoenix (2006 film), a remake of the above film starring Dermot Mulroney and Amanda Peet